Ellerbe's Mill, also known as Millvale, is a historic grist mill complex located near Rembert, Sumter County, South Carolina. The mill was built about 1830, and is a 2 1/2-story pine clapboard building mounted on wooden pilings situated on a 90-acre millpond. Also located on the property is the associated store (1910); the two-story, frame Victorian style main house (c. 1890); several tenant houses; and a dovecote.

It was added to the National Register of Historic Places in 1974.

References

Grinding mills on the National Register of Historic Places in South Carolina
Industrial buildings completed in 1830
Buildings and structures in Sumter County, South Carolina
National Register of Historic Places in Sumter County, South Carolina
Grinding mills in South Carolina
1830 establishments in South Carolina